The Texarkana Titans were a professional American football team based in Texarkana, Texas. They began play in 1967 as a member of the Southern Football League and by 1968 joined the Texas Football League, and became a member of the Continental Football League when the former merged operations with it in 1969. The Titans played in the TFL's championship game in 1968, losing 21-16 to the San Antonio Toros. After the Continental Football League dissolved in 1970, most of the Texas Division teams (including the Titans) returned to an autonomous TFL.

The Titans were just one of the four TFL franchises to remain in the league when it changed its name to the Trans-American Football League (TAFL) in late 1970. The Titans finished with the best record in the league but lost another championship game to the Toros, 20-19. The TAFL lasted just one season, after which it and the Titans ceased operations.

Season-by-season

References

Continental Football League teams
Defunct American football teams in Texas
Texarkana, Texas
American football teams established in 1968
Sports clubs disestablished in 1971
1968 establishments in Texas
1971 disestablishments in Texas